Arlesheimer See is an artificial lake within the boundaries of Freiburg im Breisgau district, in Baden-Württemberg, Germany. At an elevation of 212 m, its surface area is 0.060 km². It was first excavated in 1966. The lake, as well as 12 ha of forest surrounding it, is designated as a nature reserve, so the lake is not open for swimming. Due to the high number of found there, detected there, the lake is recognized as a European bird sanctuary under the Birds Directive.

References 

Lakes of Baden-Württemberg
Geography of Freiburg im Breisgau